MMAB is Cob(I)yrinic acid a,c-diamide adenosyltransferase, mitochondrial.

MMAB may also refer to:

 Marine Modeling and Analysis Branch, is part of the Environmental Modeling Center
 Mohammad Mohsin Alam Bhat, assistant professor at O. P. Jindal Global University